Night of 100 Stars is an all-star variety television special celebrating the centennial of the Actors' Fund of America, airing in 1982. It won the Emmy Award for Outstanding Variety, Music or Comedy Program at the 34th Primetime Emmy Awards.

Performers

References 

1982 television specials